Caladenia longicauda subsp. redacta, commonly known as the tangled white spider orchid, is a plant in the orchid family Orchidaceae and is endemic to the south-west of Western Australia. It has a single hairy leaf and up to three large, mainly white flowers with long, drooping lateral sepals and petals. It is most similar to subspecies eminems but has smaller flowers and shorter teeth on the side of the labellum.

Description
There are two or four rows of pale red calli in the centre of the labellum. Flowering occurs from September to mid-October.

Taxonomy and naming
Caladenia longicauda was first formally described by John Lindley in 1840 and the description was published in A Sketch of the Vegetation of the Swan River Colony. In 2001 Stephen Hopper and Andrew Brown described eleven subspecies, including subspecies redacta and the descriptions were published in Nuytsia. The subspecies name (redacta) is a Latin word meaning "edited" or "reduced" referring to the relatively small size of the flower compared with those of the other subspecies.

Distribution and habitat
The tangled white spider orchid mainly occurs between Collie, Mount Barker and York  in the Avon Wheatbelt and Jarrah Forest biogeographic regions where it grows in flat areas which are inundated in winter.

Conservation
Caladenia longicauda subsp. redacta  is classified as "not threatened" by the Western Australian Government Department of Parks and Wildlife.

References

longicauda subsp. redacta
Endemic orchids of Australia
Orchids of Western Australia
Plants described in 2001
Taxa named by Stephen Hopper
Taxa named by Andrew Phillip Brown